Andrew McIntosh (born 17 July 1980) is a Papua New Guinean cricketer.  McIntosh is a right-handed batsman who bowls leg break.  He was born in Madang, Madang Province.

McIntosh made his debut for Papua New Guinea in the 2011 World Cricket League Division Two.  It was in this tournament that he made his List A debut against Bermuda.  He played a further 3 List A matches in the competition, the last of which was against Hong Kong.  In his 4 matches, he scored 42 runs at a batting average of 14.00, with a high score of 18.  With the ball, he took 3 wickets at a bowling average of 25.33, with best figures of 3/14.

References

External links
Andrew McIntosh at ESPNcricinfo
Andrew McIntosh at CricketArchive

1980 births
Living people
People from Madang Province
Papua New Guinean cricketers